A parish is an administrative division used by several countries. To distinguish it from an ecclesiastical parish, the term civil parish is used in some jurisdictions, as noted below.

The table below lists countries which use this administrative division:

See also
 Muban

References

 
Types of administrative division